The Serie A Elite is the premier women's futsal league in the Italy, organized by the Italian Football Federation.The competition, which is played under UEFA rules, currently consists of 17 teams.

References 

Futsal competitions in Italy
Women's futsal leagues